Skrjabinella is a genus of parasitic alveolates in the phylum Apicomplexa.

History 
This genus was created by Matschoulsky in 1949. The genus is named after the parasitologist Skrjabin.

Taxonomy 
There is currently only one species recognised in this genus - Skrjabinella mongolica.

Life cycle 
This species was isolated from the faeces of the jerboa (Allactaga saltator). Transmission is presumably by the orofaecal route but very little is known about this species.

Description 
The oocysts have 16 sporocysts, each with one sporozoite.

References 

Apicomplexa genera